Signature Books is an American press specializing in subjects related to Utah, Mormonism, and Western Americana. The company was founded in 1980 by George D. Smith and Scott Kenney and is based in Salt Lake City, Utah. It is majority owned by the Smith-Pettit Foundation.

History 
In the late 1970s, Scott Kenney decided there needed to be a Mormon-related press that didn't have ties to the Church of Jesus Christ of Latter-day Saints.  Among those present at Signature Books's inception were George D. Smith and Scott Kenney, assisted by a board of directors composed of historians and business leaders: Eugene E. Campbell, Everett L. Cooley, David Lisonbee, D. Michael Quinn, Allen Dale Roberts, and Richard S. Van Wagoner; and an editorial board consisting of Lavina Fielding Anderson, Maureen Ursenbach Beecher, Davis Bitton, Orson Scott Card, and Jay Parry.

In 1980 Kenny and a few investors created Signature Books. In 1981 they published their first book, the satire Saintspeak by Orson Scott Card.

Several of Signature Books' publications have won awards from the Association for Mormon Letters, the John Whitmer Historical Association, the Mormon History Association, the Mountain West Center for Western Studies, and the Utah Center for the Book.

Present
Signature Books produces from eight to ten books a year, which deal with topics of western and Mormon history, fiction, essay, humor and art. Among these are the diaries of Mormon leaders such as Joseph Smith, William Clayton, Heber C. Kimball, Wilford Woodruff, L. John Nuttall, Anthon H. Lund, John Henry Smith, Rudger Clawson, B. H. Roberts and Reed Smoot. Signature has also published noted studies of well-known early Mormon theologians such as James E. Talmage, B. H. Roberts, Orson Pratt, Parley P. Pratt, Brigham Young, John Widtsoe, and award-winning biographies of significant early Mormons such as, Joseph Smith, Sidney Rigdon, Wilford Woodruff, John Taylor, as well as a biography of thirty three of the plural wives of Joseph Smith.

Controversy and criticism
A number of books produced by the publisher related to Mormon history have been considered controversial. Some authors view this as "quality liberal thinking on controversial LDS topics." Terryl Givens states that the publisher is "the main vehicle for publications that challenge the borders of Mormon orthodoxy."

Signature Books is sometimes at odds with the Foundation for Ancient Research and Mormon Studies (FARMS), an organization of Mormon scholars and apologists which promotes orthodox Mormon historical scholarship. Author Simon Southerton referred to Signature Books as "a perennial thorn in the side of FARMS." One example was Signature Book's publication of Grant H. Palmer's book An Insider's View of Mormon Origins. The publication of this book immediately resulted in five negative book reviews by FARMS. Ron Priddis of Signature Books responded to these reviews by stating: "Is nothing beyond the reach of sarcasm by FARMS polemicists?"

At one point in early 1991, FARMS claims that Signature Books threatened a lawsuit over several reviews of its books that appeared in the Review on Books of the Book of Mormon. The item which initiated the lawsuit threat was a book review published by Stephen E. Robinson, on Signature-published The Word of God: Essays on Mormon Scripture, in which Robinson blasted, "Korihor's back, and this time he's got a printing press. In its continuing assault upon traditional Mormonism, Signature Books promotes with its recent and dubiously titled work, The Word of God, ...naturalistic assumptions...in dealing with Latter-day Saint belief." Signature Books asserts that several of the scholars who participated in New Approaches considered themselves active and participating members of the LDS faith. The FARMS reviewers, for their part, considered these authors to be opponents to the LDS tradition. Signature management made an inquiry with the FARMS management, holding that such inferences were insulting and could be considered libelous. Signature then requested a retraction.

Daniel C. Peterson, an LDS scholar and member of FARMS, published a response in various newspapers in Utah. In his response, he stated that "Signature Books and George D. Smith seem...to have a clear (if unadmitted) agenda, an agenda that is often hostile to centrally important beliefs of The Church of Jesus Christ of Latter-day Saints".

In 2004, Signature Books posted on its web site a speech given by John Hatch, in which Hatch said, "After reading the (FARMS) reviews myself, it appears to me, and is my opinion, that FARMS is interested in making Mormonism's past appear as normal as possible to readers by attacking history books that discuss complex or difficult aspects of the church's past. ... I am deeply troubled by what I see as continued efforts to attack honest scholarly work."

Notes

References
.
.
.
.
.
.
.
.

External links
The official Signature Books Website
Out-of-print Signature Books on-line
About Signature Books

Companies based in Salt Lake City
Book publishing companies based in Utah
Publishing companies established in 1980
1980 establishments in Utah